The People's Revolutionary Government (PRG) was proclaimed on 13 March 1979 after the Marxist–Leninist New Jewel Movement overthrew the government of Grenada in a revolution, making Grenada the only socialist state within the Commonwealth. In Grenada, the revolution is referred to as the March 13th Revolution of 1983. The government suspended the constitution and ruled by decree until a factional conflict broke out, culminating in an invasion by the United States on 25 October 1983.

History 
The New Jewel Movement (NJM) under the leadership of Maurice Bishop was the main opposition party in Grenada during the 1970s. In 1979, the NJM overthrew the government of Eric Gairy, which had ruled the country since independence in 1974. The NJM launched an armed takeover of the radio station, police barracks, and various other key locations in Grenada while Gairy was on a trip outside the country. The armed takeover was conducted by the National Liberation Army (NLA), which had been formed in 1973 as the military wing of the NJM.

The NJM suspended the constitution and announced new laws. Maurice Bishop announced the formation of the PRG over radio, which organized a cabinet to run the country with Bishop as prime minister. All political organizations except for the NJM were banned, and membership in the NJM was thereafter tightly controlled.

Maurice Bishop expressed his objective: "We are a small country, we are a poor country, with a population of largely African descent, we are a part of the exploited Third World, and we definitely have a stake in seeking the creation of a new international economic order which would assist in ensuring economic justice for the oppressed and exploited peoples of the world, and in ensuring that the resources of the sea are used for the benefit of all the people of the world and not for a tiny minority of profiteers". The new government worried the United States, which had previously supported Eric Gairy, and whose ambassador warned: "The United States government would dislike any inclination on the part of the Grenadines to develop closer ties with Cuba."

The regime was particularly active in developing social policies: a Centre for Popular Education was established to coordinate government initiatives in education, including literacy campaigns. The learning of Grenadian Creole was allowed at school. Nevertheless, the Bishop government's tendency to marginalize the Church's role in education contributed to the deterioration of relations with the clergy. In the health sector, medical consultations were made free of charge with the help of Cuba, which provided doctors, and milk was distributed to pregnant women and children. In economics, the authorities were setting up a system of financial loans and equipment for farmers, and agricultural cooperatives were being set up to develop the activity. The Bishop government was also working to develop infrastructure, including building new roads and upgrading the power grid. Finally, the government was attacking marijuana growing operations to promote food agriculture and reduce violence. The PRG established close relations with the government of Cuba and, with Cuban assistance began construction of a large international airport.

Internationally, Grenada was increasingly isolated. The United Kingdom suspended its economic assistance and the United States used its influence to block loans from the IMF and the World Bank. The situation was also deteriorating internally: on 19 June 1980, a bomb exploded during a meeting during which Bishop was to intervene. The device killed three people and wounded 25. Bishop openly accused "American imperialism and its local agents". However, the real responsibility of the CIA was uncertain; if it had indeed imagined destabilization operations, the Carter administration was opposed to them. In 1983, Bishop finally went to Washington to try to "negotiate peace".

During the rule of the PRG Grenada achieved progress in many areas including but not limited to women's rights, education, housing, health, and the economy. By the end of the Gairy regime the economy was experiencing negative growth, per capita income was falling; when the PRG came to power, however, this quickly changed and the economy began to experience modest growth. "The World Bank noted that it had 'been one of the very few countries in the Western Hemisphere that continued to experience per capita growth in 1981'". According to Payne, Sutton and Thorndike, GDP per capita almost doubled from 1978 to 1983, income tax was also abolished for 30 percent of the lowest paid workers. Unemployment was also sharply reduced from 49% in 1979 to 14% in 1983 at a time when most other countries in the region had an unemployment rate of 20 to 30%. The number of doctors also increased from 1 per 4,000 in 1979 to 1 per 3,000 in 1982, the infant mortality rate was reduced from 29 to 14.8, and the literacy rate increased from 85% in 1978 to 90% in 1981. In regards to women's rights, sexual exploitation of women in exchange for work was outlawed, equal pay for equal work was passed and mothers were guaranteed three months’ maternity leave, two of which were paid, as well as a return to the same job they had left.

In 1983, internal divisions occurred within the central committee of the PRG. A group led by Deputy Prime Minister Bernard Coard, a hard-line militaristic element, attempted to convince Bishop to enter into a power-sharing agreement with Coard. Eventually Coard placed Bishop under house arrest and took control of the PRG government. The removal of Bishop led to large popular demonstrations in different areas of the country. In the course of one of these demonstrations, Bishop was freed by the crowd, and eventually reached the PRA headquarters at Fort Rupert.

A unit from the PRA (People's Revolutionary Army) at Fort Frederick was dispatched to Fort Rupert. Fighting broke out between that force and the civilians at Fort Rupert resulting in many deaths. Afterwards, Bishop and seven others, including several cabinet ministers, were rounded up and executed.

After the executions, a new government called the Revolutionary Military Council, led by General Hudson Austin, was formed to rule the country and the PRG ceased to exist. This government nominally ruled for six days before being ousted by the United States invasion of Grenada.

The PRG enjoyed widespread support under Maurice Bishop according to a report on a survey shortly after the United States invasion, "some 73.8 percent of the respondents stated that they felt that the PRG had very good support." This support plummeted after the assassination of Bishop.

References

External links 
 Grenadian Revolution at marxists.org

History of Grenada
Communist revolutions
Communism in Grenada
Grenada
Grenada
Grenada
Grenada
Grenada
Provisional governments